Hubert Summers Ellis  (July 6, 1887 – December 3, 1959) was a Republican United States Representative, banker and salesman from Huntington, West Virginia. He was  elected as a Republican to the Seventy-eighth, Seventy-ninth, and Eightieth Congresses (January 3, 1943 - January 3, 1949).

Ellis was born in Hurricane, Putnam County, West Virginia in 1887. He attended the public schools and Marshall College in Huntington, West Virginia. He worked in banking and as a salesman from 1910 to 1917 and in the general insurance business in 1920. He served in World War I from 1917 - 1919 as a first lieutenant in the One Hundred and Fiftieth Field Artillery, Forty-second Division. He was elected to the House in 1942 and served three consecutive terms until 1949. His candidacies in 1948 and 1950 were unsuccessful. He was subsequently appointed West Virginia director for the Federal Housing Administration on February 2, 1954, and resigned on February 10, 1958. He died in Huntington on December 3, 1959, and is buried in Woodmere Cemetery.

See also
United States congressional delegations from West Virginia

References

ELLIS, Hubert Summers Online. September 9, 2007.

1887 births
1959 deaths
Military personnel from West Virginia
American businesspeople in insurance
American military personnel of World War I
Marshall University alumni
Politicians from Huntington, West Virginia
People from Hurricane, West Virginia
United States Army officers
Republican Party members of the United States House of Representatives from West Virginia
20th-century American politicians